Seyyed Hossein Hashemi ( born 7 July 1953, Mianeh, East Azerbaijan) is an Iranian politician who served as Governor of Tehran Province from September 8, 2013 to September 24, 2017. He was previously a member of the Parliament from 1992 to 2012. He was also Head of Department of Industries at the Parliament and also President of Iran's Cycling Federation from 1995 to 2005.

References

External links

1953 births
Living people
People from Sarab, East Azerbaijan
University of Tehran alumni
Deputies of Mianeh
Governors of Tehran Province
Members of the 4th Islamic Consultative Assembly
Members of the 5th Islamic Consultative Assembly
Members of the 6th Islamic Consultative Assembly
Members of the 7th Islamic Consultative Assembly
Members of the 8th Islamic Consultative Assembly
Executives of Construction Party politicians
Iranian industrial engineers